The Swedish Finn Historical Society is a genealogical association in Seattle, Washington, US. 

Persons sharing an interest in Swedish-Finn culture, tradition and history founded the Swedish-Finn Historical Society in 1991.

Their mission statement: "To gather and preserve the emigration history of Swedish Finns across the world; connect Swedish Finns to their roots in Finland; and celebrate our cultural heritage."

The society maintains an archive and a library containing material pertaining to Swedish Finn culture, history and tradition and makes this material available for interpretive, educational and research purposes. The society publishes a periodical, the Quarterly, and maintains a web site. The Society provides genealogical information to members. The society arranges and participates in cultural events. The society invites people interested in the Swedish Finn culture and tradition worldwide to become members.

External links
The SFHS web site

Genealogical societies
Organizations established in 1991
Historiography of Finland
Historiography of Sweden
Swedish-American culture in Washington (state)

Finnish-American culture in Washington (state)
1991 establishments in Washington (state)

501(c)(3) organizations
Non-profit organizations based in Washington (state)